Cellmates is a 2011 American comedy film starring Tom Sizemore, and Olga Segura and was directed and written by producer, director, and writer Jesse Baget.

Plot 
Leroy Lowe is a racist who throughout his life has hated everything that was not as white as the color of his skin. Unexpectedly immersed in Mexican culture Leroy is forced to decide whether to return to his old life back in the United States or start a new life under the sun-drenched skies of Mexico.

Reception 

Currently, the film has a rating of 47% on Rotten Tomatoes, based on 15 reviews and an average score of 4.33/10.

References

External links 
 

2011 films
American comedy films
2011 comedy films
2010s English-language films
2010s American films